Achladi is a village near the town of Stylida, in Phthiotis Prefecture, Central Greece. It forms part of the municipal unit of Echinaioi, in the municipality of Stylida. According to the 2011 census, its population was 384.

A hill north of the village shows traces of medieval fortifications; the castle wall mostly survived until World War II, after which it was mined for building material by the locals. The castle evidently served to control sea traffic in the Malian Gulf and the North Euboean Gulf, and had visual contact to the castle of Lithada on the island of Euboea.

References

Sources
 

Villages in Greece
Populated places in Phthiotis
Castles in Greece